Arcata Elementary School District is a public school district based in Humboldt County, California.

References

External links
 

School districts in Humboldt County, California